Air Show No. 1 is an album recorded for the Italian Black Saint label by the improvisational collective New Air featuring Henry Threadgill, Fred Hopkins and Pheeroan akLaff with Cassandra Wilson providing vocals on three selections.

Reception
The Allmusic review by Scott Yanow awarded the album 4 stars, stating, "[Wilson] does an expert job of fitting into this complex music, giving a strong blues feeling to some of altoist Henry Threadgill's originals".

Track listing
All compositions by Henry Threadgill
 "Achtud El Buod (Children's Song)" – 6:28
 "Don't Drink That Corner My Life is in the Bush" (lyrics by Cassandra Wilson) – 9:13
 "Air Show" – 5:20
 "Apricots on Their Wings" – 6:03
 "Salute to the Enema Bandit" – 7:20
 "Side Step" – 7:06
 Recorded at Barigozzi Studio, Milano, Italy on June 2 & 3, 1986

Personnel
Henry Threadgill – alto saxophone, tenor saxophone, flute, eastern banjo
Fred Hopkins – bass
Pheeroan akLaff – percussion
Cassandra Wilson – vocals

References

1987 albums
Air (free jazz trio) albums
Cassandra Wilson albums
Black Saint/Soul Note albums